The Derby Half Marathon is an annual half marathon road running event held in Derby, UK in June, organised by Jane Tomlinson's Run For All organisation.

Over 2,000 runners take part in the race, which starts on Irongate in Derby City Centre.

The course then heads out of the city on London Road before passing through the grounds of Elvaston Castle.

It then joins the River Derwent riverside path and heads through the Pride Park Estate, over the A6 Pride Parkway flyover and through the Bass's Recreation Ground and Derby River Gardens, before heading along Morledge, Corporation Street and Full Street back to the finish on Irongate.

The race was originally known as the Derby Ramathon which was the name used for a popular local half marathon and marathon race which was held in Derby in the eighties and early nineties. 

In 2018, the race was renamed the Derby Half Marathon after the race organisation was taken over by the Run For All company and was held under that name until 2021.

Due to COVID-19, the 2020 Derby Half Marathon was initially postponed until 13 June 2021 before finally taking place on 28 November 2021.

From 2022, the race reverted to the previous Ramathon name and returned to its traditional mid-June date.

Winners 
Key:

External links 
Official Website
2021 results - RunBritain
2019 results - RunBritain
2018 results - RunBritain
2017 results - RunBritain 
2016 results - RunBritain
2015 results - RunBritain
2014 results - RunBritain

Athletics competitions in England
Recurring sporting events established in 2014
2014 establishments in England
Sport in Derby